Gustave Denis (20 August 1833, Saint-Georges-Buttavent – 2 February 1925) was a French industrialist and politician.

1833 births
1925 deaths
People from Mayenne
French Protestants
Politicians from Pays de la Loire
Republican Federation politicians
French Senators of the Third Republic
French industrialists
École Centrale Paris alumni
Chevaliers of the Légion d'honneur
Senators of Mayenne